WBLX-FM (92.9 MHz, "93BLX") is an American urban contemporary music-formatted radio station that serves Mobile, Lower Alabama, and Pensacola, Florida. The station has served the Gulf Coast for more than 50 years.  Owned by Cumulus Media, its studios are on Dauphin Avenue in Midtown Mobile, and its transmitter is near Robertsdale, Alabama.

The station was assigned the WBLX-FM call letters by the Federal Communications Commission on July 4, 1988. In 2006, WBLX began broadcasting in IBOC digital radio, using the HD Radio system from iBiquity.

History
WBLX began in October 1973 as FM counterpart to gospel station WMOO (1550 AM). As WBLX, with the CHUrban format and then as an Urban Contemporary format, has been one of the market's leading stations with the same calls and format for 45 years. In 1998, Cumulus acquired competitor WDLT-FM, and skewed it to being an Urban Adult Contemporary. This has allowed WBLX to skew its programming towards a younger audience as a Mainstream Urban. For many years, WBLX also carried "The Beat of the Bay 93BLX!" and "93BLX Jamz!" brandnames, But however in 2000 they changed their current slogan to "The Big Station 93BLX".

Cumulus Broadcasting began upgrading its stations to HD Radio broadcasting in 2005. One of the first ten stations to be upgraded was WBLX-FM.

WBLX is one of the most powerful radio stations in the Gulf region. It can be heard from New Orleans, Montgomery, AL, South Georgia, Panama City, Fl, and 100 miles out in the Gulf of Mexico.

Personnel
E.J. Greig is the Program Director.

Steve Harvey Morning Show Host.

DJ Blayze, Air Personality/Mixer.

Nick @ Night Air personality.

Janice More Gospel Show host.

Mz, Baldy Weekends.

References

External links
WBLX official website

BLX-FM
Urban contemporary radio stations in the United States
Radio stations established in 1973
1973 establishments in Alabama
Cumulus Media radio stations